Dai Dai N'tab (born 17 August 1994) is a Dutch professional long track speed skater who specializes in the sprint distances. He is a member of Team Plantina. He has a Senegalese father and a Dutch mother.

Career
At the 2016 Dutch Sprint Championships he finished 12th but won the second 500m.

On 3 December 2016 he won the 500 m at the third World Cup of the 2016/17 season, held in Astana. It was his first World Cup win and in doing so he improved his personal record by 0.44s and set a new track record.

He studied Communication and Marketing at the Johan Cruyff College in Groningen.

Personal records

Tournament overview

Source:

World Cup overview

Source:

 GWC = Grand World Cup
 – = Did not participate
 DQ = Disqualified
 (b) = World Cup division B

References

External links
 
 

1994 births
Living people
Sportspeople from Amsterdam
Dutch male speed skaters
Dutch people of Senegalese descent
World Single Distances Speed Skating Championships medalists